Mixtecatl (From Nahuatl, 'Inhabitant of the land of clouds') is one of the six giants sons of Iztac-Mixcoatl and Tlaltecuhtli or Ilancueitl that populated the Earth after the Great Flood during the Fifth Sun in Aztec mythology. The fifth son who founded Mixtlan from where the natives of the region known today as Mixteca come from.

References 

Aztec legendary creatures
Native American giants